Isognathus leachii is a moth of the  family Sphingidae.

Distribution 
It is known from southern Panama and from Colombia, Venezuela, Brazil, Ecuador, Bolivia and Argentina.

Description 
The wingspan is about 85 mm for males and 94 mm for females. There are indistinct bands on the upperside of the abdomen and an elongate patch on the forewing upperside. The inner edge of the dark brown marginal band of the hindwing upperside is distinctly and almost regularly dentate and not constant in width.

Biology 
There are probably multiple generations per year.

The larvae have been recorded feeding on Allamanda cathartica and Allamanda blancheti. They have long tails and are very colourful, suggesting they are unpalatable to birds.

References

Isognathus
Moths described in 1823